Reyners v Belgium (1974) Case 2/74 is an EU law case, concerning the free movement of services in the European Union.

Facts
Jean Reyners was a Dutch national with a degree in law. He applied for admission to the Bar of Belgium but was refused on the grounds that he lacked Belgian nationality. He claimed that this breached the Treaty's provisions on free movement of services, now Article 56 TFEU.

The Belgian Conseil d'Etat asked the European Court of Justice (ECJ) whether the legal profession of avocat was wholly exempt under the Art 51 TFEU official authority exception, given that part of the business was concerned with exercise of official authority. The Luxembourg government also argued that the whole profession should be exempt, given that it was "connected organically" to the public administration of justice.

Advocate general Mayras gave an opinion that "official authority" is "the power of enjoying the prerogatives outside the general law, privileges of official power, and powers of coercion over citizens".

Judgment
The European Court of Justice held that Article 49 TFEU was directly effective, even though directives had not been adopted. It laid down a precise result to be achieved. The advocate profession was not exempted from Article 49 under Article 51, because judicial exercise of power was left intact. There needed to be a single community definition and that the exemption could not be construed more broadly than would fit its purpose. If specific activities involving exercise of official authority are severable from the rest of a profession, then Article 51 cannot apply to exempt the whole lot.

See also

 Van Binsbergen v Bestuur van de Bedrijfvereniging voor de Metaalnijverheid
 European Union law

Notes

European Union services case law
1974 in case law
1974 in the European Economic Community
Legal history of Belgium
Belgium–Netherlands relations